Mohammad Ghaedibardeh, is an Iranian professional Muay Thai kickboxer. He currently competes in the cruiserweight division, where he is the current Enfusion Middleweight Champion. Ghaedibardeh formerly fought in K-1 and the Romanian-based SAS Gym. As of May 2022, he was the #5 ranked middleweight kickboxer in the world by Combat Press.

Championships and awards

Kickboxing
Enfusion
2021 Enfusion Middleweight (-84 kg) Championship

Fight record
{| class="wikitable collapsible" style="font-size:88%; width:100%; text-align:center;"
|-
! colspan=9  | Professional Kickboxing record (Incomplete)
|-
| style="background:white" colspan=9  |58 Wins (41 (T)KOs), 7 Losses, 1 No Contest
|-
! Date || Result || Opponent || Event || Location || Method || Round || Time

|-  style="background:#c5d2ea;"
| 2022-12-16 || NC ||align=left| Darren Anstey || Enfusion 117 || Dubai, United Arab Emirates || No Contest (Low blow) || 2 || 1:26
|-

|-  style="background:#fbb;"
| 2022-03-26 || Loss ||align=left| Nikos Tzotzos Echetlaios || Vendetta 25 || Istanbul, Turkey ||  TKO (retirement/injury) || 3 || 3:00  
|-  style="background:#cfc"
| 2021-11-12 || Win ||align=left| Khalid El Bakouri || Enfusion 104 || Abu Dhabi, United Arab Emirates || Decision (unanimous) || 5 || 3:00 
|-
! style=background:white colspan=9 |
|-  style="background:#cfc"
| 2019-12-06 || Win ||align=left| Thiago Machado || Enfusion 93 || Abu Dhabi, United Arab Emirates || KO (body knee + punch) || 1 || 2:09
|-  style="background:#cfc"
| 2019-10-05 || Win ||align=left| Jente Nnamadim || Enfusion 88 || Dordrecht, Netherlands || KO (knee to head) || 1 || 1:26
|-  style="background:#cfc"
| 2019-06-13 || Win ||align=left| Alexandru Irimia || SAS Gym 02 || Bucharest, Romania || TKO (referee stoppage) || 1 || 2:36
|-  style="background:#fbb;"
| 2019-02-16 || Loss ||align=left| Ibrahim Bagli || Akin Dövüş Arenasi || Istanbul, Turkey || DQ (clinch two knee) || 1 || 1:10  
|-  style="background:#cfc"
| 2018-12-07 || Win ||align=left| Johane Beauséjour || Enfusion 76 || Abu Dhabi, United Arab Emirates || KO (high kick) || 3 || 0:35
|-  style="background:#cfc"
| 2018-09-15|| Win ||align=left| Sudsakorn Sor Klinmee || Shang Wu Hero || China || Decision (unanimous) || 3 || 3:00

|-  style="background:#cfc"
| 2018-06-09|| Win ||align=left| Yahya Geylani || Fight Arena || Istanbul, Turkey || KO (flying knee) || 1 ||

|-  style="background:#cfc"
| 2018-05-05|| Win ||align=left| Daryl Sichtman || World Champions Kick Boxing Night || Istanbul, Turkey|| Decision (unanimous) || 3 || 3:00

|-  style="background:#fbb;"
| 2017-11-18 || Loss ||align=left| Rungrawee KemMuaythaiGym || EM Legend 25 || Sandu Gulu, China || Decision (unanimous) || 3 || 3:00

|-  bgcolor="#fbb"
| 2017-11-11 || Loss ||align=left| Donovan Wisse ||  || Istanbul, Turkey || TKO || 2 ||

|-  bgcolor="#cfc"
| 2017-09-05 || Win ||align=left| Thomas Nelson || Kartal Fight Arena || Istanbul, Turkey || Decision (unanimous) || 3 || 3:00

|-  style="background:#cfc;"
| 2017-07-09 || Win ||align=left| Parinya M.U.Den|| EM Legend 21 || Chongqing, China || KO (left uppercut) || 2 || 2:10

|-  style="background:#cfc;"
| 2017-04-28 || Win ||align=left| Gadzhimurad Amirzhanov|| EM Legend 18 || Dujiangyan, China || KO (left cross) || 1 || 1:26

|-  bgcolor="#CCFFCC"
| 2016-12-23|| Win ||align=left| Aleksandr Shuliak || EM Legend 15 || China || KO  ||  ||

|-  style="background:#cfc"
| 2016-09-24 || Win ||align=left| Johane Beauséjour || Faith Fight|| Xi'an, China || Decision || 3 || 3:00

|-  style="background:#fbb;"
| 2016-08-27 || Loss||align=left| Dzmitry Baranau || EM Legend 11|| Dujiangyan, China || TKO (knee injury) || 2 || 0:50

|-  style="background:#cfc;"
| 2016-06-05 || Win ||align=left| Ivan Grigoriev || EM Legend 9 || Chengdu, China || TKO (punches) || 2 || 2:10

|-  style="background:#cfc;"
| 2016- || Win ||align=left| Alexandru Stan || EM Legend ||  China || KO (right hook) || 1 || 
 
|-  style="background:#cfc;"
| 2016-01- || Win ||align=left| Wang Huaisheng || EM Legend  || China || KO (knee to the body) || 1 || 2:45

|-  style="background:#cfc;"
| 2015- || Win ||align=left| Feng Lei || EM Legend  || China || TKO (punches) || 2 || 1:32

|-  style="background:#cfc;"
| 2015- || Win ||align=left|  || Shandong Heroes  || China || KO (low kick) || 3 ||

|-  style="background:#fbb;"
| 2014-10-11 || Loss ||align=left| Paul Daley || K-1 World MAX 2014 World Championship Tournament Final || Pattaya, Thailand || Decision (unanimous) || 3 || 3:00

|-  style="background:#cfc;"
| 2014-04-13 || Win||align=left|  Thanilek S.P.L.Chumporn || Bangla Stadium || Phuket, Thailand || KO (high kick) || 1 ||

|-  style="background:#fbb;"
| 2013-08-02 || Loss ||align=left| Atakan Arslan || Bangla Stadium || Phuket, Thailand || Decision  || 5 || 3:00 
|-
| colspan=9 | Legend:    

|-  style="background:#fbb;"
| 2016-11-24|| Loss ||align=left| Diogo Calado || IFMA World Cup 2016 in Kazan, Semi Final || Kazan, Russia || Decision|| 3 ||
|-
! style=background:white colspan=9 |
|-
| colspan=9 | Legend:

See also
List of male kickboxers

References

Living people
Iranian male kickboxers
Cruiserweight kickboxers
Iranian Muay Thai practitioners
Iranian expatriate sportspeople in the Netherlands
1992 births